Crow is a surname, and may refer to:

 Ashley Crow, American actress
 Barbara Crow, Canadian sociologist
 Bob Crow, British trade union leader
 Charles A. Crow, a U.S. Representative from Missouri
 Chief Crow, Sioux leader
 Dan Crow (musician), Emmy award-winning children's musician
 Dan Crow (computer scientist), computer scientist who was in charge of Google's web crawler development as of 2007
 Dan Crow, pseudonym for author Ernest Aris
 Danny Crow, professional football player
 Dolores Crow, a U.S. Representative from Idaho
 Edward Coke Crow, American politician
 Enid Crow, artist
 Frank Fools Crow, Lakota Sioux spiritual leader
 Franklin C. Crow, American computer scientist and author
 George Crow, computer specialist
 James F. Crow, professor of Genetics
 Jason Crow, a U.S. Representative from Colorado
 Joe Medicine Crow, Crow tribe historian and author
 John Crow, Governor of the Bank of Canada
 John David Crow, professional American football player
 Kevin Crow, professional indoor soccer player
 L. C. Crow, American politician
 Max Crow, Australian rules footballer
 Michael Crow, journalist
 Rob Crow, (born 1970), musician
 Sam Crow, disambiguation
 Sheryl Crow, American singer/songwriter
 Stephen Crow, ZX Spectrum game programmer
 Thomas S. Crow, Master Chief Petty Officer of the US Navy
 Thomas E. Crow, American historian and art critic
 Tim Crow, British psychiatrist and researcher
 Trammell Crow, American property developer 
 William E. Crow, American politician

See also
 Jim Crow (character), blackface character for which Jim Crow laws were named
 Crowe (surname)